Greenhill Road is a major road in Adelaide, South Australia, that provides a connection to the eastern and hills suburbs. Its western section, running along the south side of Adelaide Parklands, forms part of Adelaide's City Ring Route.

Route
The eastern end of Greenhill Road is in Balhannah in the Adelaide Hills. It winds through Carey Gully, Uraidla, Summertown and Greenhill as a two-lane road.

In the metropolitan area, it is four lanes and passes by the City of Burnside suburbs of Burnside, Hazelwood Park, Linden Park, Tusmore, Toorak Gardens, Dulwich and Glenside until it reaches the edge of the Adelaide Parklands. The road then expands to six lanes and heads past Eastwood and the City of Unley suburbs of Parkside, Unley and Wayville as part of the City Ring Route. This section was originally designated "Park Terrace".

Greenhill Road continues west as Richmond Road from the intersection of Anzac Highway.

Major intersections

See also

References 

City of Burnside
Roads in Adelaide